Gazi Nuruzzaman Babul is a Bangladesh Nationalist Party politician and a Member of Parliament from Pirojpur-1.

Career
Babul was elected to parliament from Pirojpur-1 as an Bangladesh Nationalist Party candidate in February 1996.

References

Bangladesh Nationalist Party politicians
Date of birth missing (living people)
6th Jatiya Sangsad members